Jambudvīpa (Pali: Jambudīpa) is a name often used to describe the territory of Greater India in Ancient Indian sources.
The term is based on the concept of dvīpa, meaning "island" or "continent" in Ancient Indian cosmogony. The term Jambudvipa was used by Ashoka to represent his realm in the third century BCE. The same terminology was used in subsequent texts, for instance Kannada inscriptions from the tenth century CE which also described the region, presumably Ancient India, as Jambudvipa.

The word Jambudvīpa literally refers to "the land of Jambu trees" where jambu (Syzygium cumini) grows.

Puranic description 

According to Puranic cosmography, the world is divided into seven concentric island continents (sapta-dvipa vasumati) separated by the seven encircling oceans, each double the size of the preceding one (going out from within). The seven continents of the Puranas are stated as Jambudvipa, Plaksadvipa, Salmalidvipa, Kusadvipa, Krouncadvipa, Sakadvipa, and Pushkaradvipa. Seven intermediate oceans consist of salt-water, sugarcane juice, wine, ghee, yogurt, milk and water respectively. The mountain range called Lokaloka, meaning "world-no-world", stretches across this final sea, delineating the known world from the dark void.

Continent Jambudvipa (Rose Tree Island), also known as Sudarshanadvipa, forms the innermost concentric island in the above scheme. There is a belief that this island named after the people who lived in this island known as Sambavas.  Its name is said to derive from a Jambu tree (another name for the Indian Blackberry). The fruits of the Jambu tree are said, in the Viṣṇupurāṇa (ch.2) to be as large as elephants and when they become rotten and fall upon the crest of the mountains, a river of juice is formed from their expressed juice. The river so formed is called Jambunadi (Jambu river) and flows through Jambudvipa, whose inhabitants drink its waters. Insular continent Jambudvipa is said to comprise nine varshas (zones) and eight significant parvatas (mountains).

Markandeya Purana portrays Jambudvipa as being depressed on its south and north and elevated and broad in the middle. The elevated region forms the varsha named Ila-vrta or Meruvarsha. At the center of Ila-vrta lies the golden Mount Meru, the king of mountains. On the summit of Mount Meru, is the vast city of Lord Brahma, known as Brahmapuri. Surrounding  Brahmapuri are 8 cities -  the one of Lord Indra and of seven other Devatas.

Markandeya Purana and Brahmanda Purana divide Jambudvipa into four vast regions shaped like four petals of a lotus with Mount Meru being located at the center like a pericarp. The city of Brahmapuri is said to be enclosed by a river, known as Akasha Ganga. Akasha Ganga is said to issue forth from the foot of Lord Vishnu and after washing the lunar region falls "through the skies" and after encircling the Brahmapuri "splits up into four mighty streams", which are said to flow in four opposite directions from the landscape of Mount Meru and irrigate the vast lands of Jambudvipa.

The common names of the dvīpas, having their varṣas (9 for Jambu-dvīpa, 7 for the other dvīpas) with a mountain and a river in each varṣa, is given in several Purāṇas. There is a distinct set of names provides, however, in other Purāṇas. The most detailed geography is that described in the Vāyu Purāṇa.

In Buddhism
In the Kāmadhātu is located Mount Sumeru which is said to be surrounded by four island-continents. "The southernmost island is called Jambudvīpa". The other three continents of Buddhist accounts around Sumeru are not accessible to humans from Jambudvīpa. Jambudvīpa is shaped like a triangle with a blunted point facing south, somewhat like the Indian subcontinent. In its center is a gigantic Jambu tree from which the continent takes its name, meaning "Jambu Island".

Jambudipa, one of the four Mahādīpas, or great continents, which are included in the Cakkavāla and are ruled by a Cakkavatti. They are grouped round Mount Sumeru. In Jambudīpa is Himavā with its eighty-four thousand peaks, its lakes, mountain ranges, etc.

This continent derives its name from the Jambu-tree (also called Naga) which grows there, its trunk fifteen yojanas in girth, its outspreading branches fifty yojanas in length, its shade one hundred yojanas in extent and its height one hundred yojanas (Vin.i.30; SNA.ii.443; Vsm.i.205f; Sp.i.119, etc.) On account of this tree, Jambudīpa is also known as Jambusanda (SN.vs.552; SNA.i.121). The continent is ten thousand yojanas in extent; of these ten thousand, four thousand are covered by the ocean, three thousand by the Himālaya mountains, while three thousand are inhabited by men (SNA.ii.437; UdA.300).

Jambudvīpa is the region where the humans live and is the only place where a being may become enlightened by being born as a human being. It is in Jambudvīpa that one may receive the gift of Dharma and come to understand the Four Noble Truths, the Noble Eightfold Path and ultimately realize the liberation from the cycle of life and death. Another reference is from the Buddhist text Mahavamsa, where the emperor Ashoka's son Mahinda introduces himself to the Sri Lankan king Devanampiyatissa as from Jambudvipa, referring to what is now the Indian subcontinent. This is Based In the Kṣitigarbha Sūtra in the Mahayana.

In Jainism

According to Jain cosmology, Jambūdvīpa is at the centre of Madhyaloka, or the middle part of the universe, where the humans reside.
Madhyaloka consists of many continent-islands surrounded by oceans, first eight whose names are:
{| class="wikitable"
|- style="background-color:#FFFF00;font-size:12pt;font-weight:bold" valign="top"
| width="141" Height="15.75" | Continent/ Island
| width="165" | Ocean
|- style="font-style:Italic"  valign="top"
|style="font-style:Italic" Height="12.75" | Jambūdvīpa
 | Lavanoda (Salt - ocean)
|- style="font-style:Italic"  valign="top"
|style="font-style:Italic" Height="12.75" | Dhatki Khand
 | Kaloda (Black sea)
|- style="font-style:Italic"  valign="top"
|style="font-style:Italic" Height="12.75" | Puskarvardvīpa
 | Puskaroda (Lotus Ocean)
|- style="font-style:Italic"  valign="top"
|style="font-style:Italic" Height="12.75" | Varunvardvīpa
 | Varunoda (Varun Ocean)
|- style="font-style:Italic"  valign="top"
|style="font-style:Italic" Height="12.75" | Kshirvardvīpa
 | Kshiroda (Ocean of milk)
|- style="font-style:Italic"  valign="top"
|style="font-style:Italic" Height="12.75" | Ghrutvardvīpa
 | Ghrutoda (Ghee ocean)
|- style="font-style:Italic"  valign="top"
|style="font-style:Italic" Height="12.75" | Ikshuvardvīpa
 | Iksuvaroda (Ocean of Sugarcane Juice)
|- style="font-style:Italic"  valign="top"
|style="font-style:Italic" Height="12.75" | Nandishwardvīpa
|style="font-style:Italic" | Nandishwaroda
|}

Mount Meru is at the centre of the world surrounded by Jambūdvīpa, in form of a circle forming a diameter of 100,000 yojanas.

Jambūdvīpa continent has 6  mountains, dividing the continent into 9 zones (Kshetra). The names of these zones are:
Bharat Kshetra
Mahavideha Kshetra
Airavat Kshetra
Ramyakwas
Hariwas
Hairanyvat Kshetra
Haimavat Kshetra
Devkuru
Uttarkuru

Architecture
Jambudweep Jain tirtha in Hastinapur, constructed under supervision of Gyanmati Mataji, is a depiction of Jambudvipa as per Jain cosmology.

Jambudvipa in geopolitical sense 

The term Jambudvipa is used by Ashoka perhaps to represent his realm in 3rd century BC, same terminology is then repeated in subsequent inscriptions for instance Mysorean inscription from the tenth century AD which also describes the region, presumably India, as Jambudvipa.

See also
Names for India
Shakadvipa
Uttarakuru
Karshvar, equivalent continents in the Avesta

Notes

External links
The Jambudvipa of Buddhist texts (metta.lk)

Toponyms for India
Jain cosmology
Locations in Hindu mythology
Buddhist cosmology
Esoteric cosmology